XEHI-AM is a Spanish-language radio station in Ciudad Miguel Alemán, Tamaulipas, Mexico on 1470 AM.

History
XEHI received its concession on March 13, 1953. It was owned by Gustavo Gómez Paez. XEHI raised its daytime power by the 1980s (to 3,000 watts from 1,000).

In 1998, the station was acquired by Maida Tomasita and Melisa Gómez Stringel, who in turn sold it to Gallegos González in 2005.

In 2017, station group Grupo Mi Radio became known as Corporativo Radiofónico de México after it was sold by Roberto Chapa Zavala to businessman Luis Alfredo Biassi.

External links

References

1987 establishments in Mexico
Radio stations established in 1987
Radio stations in Tamaulipas
Spanish-language radio stations